Cystofilobasidium is a genus of fungi in the family Cystofilobasidiaceae. Species occur as yeasts, but produce filamentous sexual states that form dikaryote teliospores, from which the unicellular basidia (if present) are formed. The hyphae usually have dolipore septa without a parenthesome, and their cell walls contain xylose. The genus currently contains six species worldwide.

References

Tremellomycetes
Taxa named by Franz Oberwinkler
Taxa described in 1983
Basidiomycota genera